Anemic infarcts (also called white infarcts or pale infarcts) are white or pale infarcts caused by arterial occlusions, and are usually seen in the heart, kidney and spleen. These are referred to as "white" because of the lack of hemorrhaging and limited red blood cells accumulation, (compare to Hemorrhagic infarct). The tissues most likely to be affected are solid organs which limit the amount of hemorrhage that can seep into the area of ischemic necrosis from adjoining capillary beds. The organs typically include single blood supply (no dual arterial blood supply or anastomoses). The infarct generally results grossly in a wedge shaped area of necrosis with the apex closest to the occlusion and the base at the periphery of the organ. The margins will become better defined with time with a narrow rim of congestion attributable to inflammation at the edge of the lesion. Relatively few extravasated red cells are lysed so the resulting hemosiderosis is limited and results in a progressively more pale area of infarction with time. Ischemic coagulative necrosis results and fibrosis of the affected area develops from the reparative response beginning at the preserved margins and working its way inwards. One exception to coagulative necrosis is the brain, which undergoes liquefactive necrosis in response to infarction.

See also 
 Hemorrhagic infarct
 Infarction

References 

Vascular diseases
Gross pathology